Axel Freimuth (born 27 October 1957) is a German physicist. On 1 April 2005 he succeeded the mathematician Tassilo Küpper as Rector of University of Cologne. His initial appointment was for a term of four years but this has subsequently been extended.

Early life and education 
Freimuth was born in Duisburg. He studied Physics at the University of Cologne, receiving his doctorate and 1989 and his post-doctoral habilitation in 1994. His dissertations were titled as follows:  
 1989 Über die Transporteigenschaften valenzinstabiler Verbindungen
 1994 Transporteigenschaften im gemischten Zustand der Hochtemperatur-Supraleiter
While a student he also took work as a supply teacher at the comprehensive school in Cologne-Chorweiler and further supplemented his income by working as a truck driver, although in a later interview he insisted that during those years he never lost sight of his core academic goals.

Career 
In 1996 Freimuth accepted an invitation to transfer to Karlsruhe (KIT) as a professor of physics at the university Physics Institute. However, in 1998 he was tempted back to Cologne, accepting a "C-4 professorship" in experimental solid state physics. His principal areas of research within the field of solid state physics include superconductivity, magnetism and electronic strongly correlated matter.

Freimuth was chair of the University Physics Group between April 2000 and 2003. In 2002 he undertook a research stay at the University of British Columbia  in Vancouver.

In 2003 he became dean of the Faculty for Mathematics and Natural Sciences at Cologne, and in April 2005 he became the university's forty-ninth rector since 1919.  At the end of 2005 he was invited to take on the leadership of the prestigious Jülich Research Centre but turned down the invitation in order to renew his contract for the rectorship at Cologne where he has become the longest serving university rector in more than a century.   He served between 2008 and 2010 as chair of the regional rectors' conference and of the Cologne Sciences Forum ("Kölner Wissenschaftsrunde").   He also involved himself with the German Physics Society ("Deutsche Physikalische Gesellschaft" / DPG) and in committees of the Munich-based Max Planck Society.

Other activities

Corporate boards
 Deutsche Bank, member of the advisory board

Non-profit organizations
 Konrad Adenauer Prize, member of the advisory board
 Max Planck Institute for Biology of Ageing, member of the board of trustees
 Max Planck Institute for Metabolism Research, member of the board of trustees
 Max Planck Institute for Plant Breeding Research, member of the board of trustees
 Max Planck Institute for Radio Astronomy, member of the board of trustees
 Max Planck Institute for the Study of Societies (MPIfG), member of the board of trustees
 University of Cologne, Centre for Financial Research (CFR), member of the advisory board

Recognition 
In 2014 Freimuth came second in the election for "University rector of the year", organised by the University Teachers' Association ("Deutscher Hochschulverband" / DHV), beaten to top position by second time winner Lambert T. Koch of Wuppertal.

Personal life 
Asked about his hobbies, Freimuth disclosed that he tries to find half an hour to play the guitar each evening, sometimes playing along to film music on the television. He also likes to cook. He went on to indicate, however, that his family are less than enthusiastic about his guitar playing, and the cooking loses its appeal when he is dieting.

References 

20th-century German physicists
21st-century German physicists
Academic staff of the University of Cologne
Rectors of the University of Cologne
Academic staff of the Karlsruhe Institute of Technology
People from Duisburg